Andrea Zemanová (born  in Vrchlabí) is a Czech freestyle skier, specializing in ski cross and alpine skier.

Zemanová competed at the 2014 Winter Olympics for Czech Republic. She placed 20th in the seeding run for the ski cross event. In the first round, she finished third in her heat, failing to advance.

As of September 2015, her best showing at the Alpine World Championships is 32nd, in the 2011 Super-G. Her best showing at the Freestyle World Championships is 14th, in the 2015 ski cross.

Zemanová made her Freestyle World Cup debut in December 2013. As of September 2015, she has one World Cup podium finish, a silver at Åre in 2014–15. Her best Freestyle World Cup overall finish in ski cross is 11th, in 2014–15.

Zemanová made her Alpine World Cup debut in December 2010. As of September 2015, she has yet to finish an Alpine World Cup race.

World Cup Podiums

References

1993 births
Living people
Olympic freestyle skiers of the Czech Republic
Freestyle skiers at the 2014 Winter Olympics
People from Vrchlabí
Czech female alpine skiers
Czech female freestyle skiers
Sportspeople from the Hradec Králové Region